Black Lake is a lake in the Mackenzie River drainage basin in northern Saskatchewan, Canada. The primary inflows are the Chipman River, Cree River, Fond du Lac River, and Souter River; the primary outflow is Fond du Lac River, which flows via the Mackenzie River into the Arctic Ocean.

The community of Black Lake is located on the northwest shore of the lake, near where the Fond du Lac River exits.

Fish species
The fish species in the lake include walleye, yellow perch, northern pike, lake trout, Arctic grayling, lake whitefish, cisco, white sucker, longnose sucker, and burbot.

See also
List of lakes of Saskatchewan

References

Fish Species of Saskatchewan

Lakes of Saskatchewan
Road-inaccessible communities of Saskatchewan
Division No. 18, Saskatchewan